José Ribamar Celestino (3 July 1942 – 22 August 2007) was a Brazilian footballer.

References

External links
 Obituary on jornalpequeno.com.br
 Obituary on terceirotempo.bol.uol.com.br

1942 births
2007 deaths
Association football midfielders
Brazilian footballers
CR Vasco da Gama players
Pan American Games medalists in football
Pan American Games silver medalists for Brazil
Footballers at the 1959 Pan American Games
Medalists at the 1959 Pan American Games